Lockridge may refer to:

People
 Hildegarde Dolson Lockridge (1908–1981) American poet, playwright and novelist
 Richard Lockridge (1899–1982), American writer of detective fiction
 Rocky Lockridge (1959–2019), American former professional boxer
 Ross Lockridge Jr. (1914–1948), American novelist
 S. M. Lockridge (1913–2000), American pastor

Places
 Lockridge, Iowa, United States
 Lockridge, Western Australia

See also
 Lockeridge, Wiltshire, England